Peter Sharne (born 22 March 1956 in Sydney) is an Australian former footballer who played as a winger.

He spent his entire career with NSL club Marconi.  He started in 1977 until 1988.  He made a total of 186 national league appearances.  He also played on loan in Hong Kong for Eastern AA in the early 1980s for about two seasons.  He was a star in the Hong Kong league where he was selected to be on the League Best XI.

He was a member of Australian national team during the 1978 World Cup qualifying campaign.  He made his debut as a substitute against Iran in August 1977 in Melbourne. He also played in the 1982 World Cup campaign. He earned 40 caps for Australia with 23 of them A internationals.  He scored 10 goals (eight A-international goals).  He won the Award of Distinction from Australian Football Hall of Fame.

References
https://archive.today/20121231042821/http://www.theworldgame.com.au/home/index.php?pid=st&cid=77040

Living people
1956 births
Australia international soccer players
National Soccer League (Australia) players
Soccer players from Sydney
Eastern Sports Club footballers
Marconi Stallions FC players
Expatriate footballers in Hong Kong
Association football wingers
Australian soccer players
1980 Oceania Cup players